Edmund Beaufort, 2nd Duke of Somerset, 4th Earl of Somerset, 1st Earl of Dorset, 1st Marquess of Dorset styled 1st Count of Mortain, KG (140622 May 1455), was an English nobleman and an important figure during the Hundred Years' War. His rivalry with Richard, Duke of York, was a leading cause of the Wars of the Roses.

Origins
Edmund Beaufort was the fourth surviving son of John Beaufort, 1st Earl of Somerset, the eldest of the four legitimised children of John of Gaunt (1340-1399) (third surviving son of King Edward III) by his mistress Katherine Swynford. Edmund's mother was Margaret Holland, a daughter of Thomas Holland, 2nd Earl of Kent by his wife Alice FitzAlan, a daughter of Richard FitzAlan, 10th Earl of Arundel by his wife Eleanor of Lancaster, 5th daughter of Henry, 3rd Earl of Lancaster, a grandson of King Henry III. Edmund was thus a cousin of both Richard, Duke of York, and the Lancastrian King Henry VI.

Career
Although he was the head of one of the greatest families in England, his inheritance was worth only 300 pounds. By contrast his rival, Richard, Duke of York, had a net worth of 5,800 pounds. His cousin King Henry VI's efforts to compensate Somerset with offices worth 3,000 pounds only served to offend many of the nobles, and as his quarrel with York grew more personal, the dynastic situation got worse. Another quarrel with Richard Neville, Earl of Warwick over the lordships of Glamorgan and Morgannwg may have forced the leader of the younger Nevilles into York's camp.

His brothers were taken captive at the Battle of Baugé in 1421, but Edmund was too young at the time to fight. He acquired much military experience while his brothers were prisoners.

Affair with Catherine of Valois
In 1427 it is believed that Edmund Beaufort may have embarked on an affair with Catherine of Valois, the widow of King Henry V. Evidence is sketchy; however, the liaison prompted a parliamentary statute regulating the remarriage of queens of England. The historian G. L. Harriss surmised that it was possible that another of its consequences was Catherine's son Edmund Tudor and that Catherine, to avoid the penalties of breaking the statute of 1427–8, secretly married Owen Tudor. He wrote: "By its very nature the evidence for Edmund Tudor's parentage is less than conclusive, but such facts as can be assembled permit the agreeable possibility that Edmund 'Tudor' and Margaret Beaufort were first cousins and that the royal house of 'Tudor' sprang in fact from Beauforts on both sides."

Political power and conflict

Edmund received the county of Mortain in Normandy on 22 April 1427. Edmund became a commander in the English army in 1431, and in 1432 was one of the envoys to the Council of Basel. After his recapture of Harfleur and his lifting of the Burgundian siege of Calais, he was named a Knight of the Garter in 1436. After subsequent successes he was created Earl of Dorset on 28 August 1442 (though he seems to have been styled as such since around 1438) and Marquess of Dorset on 24 June 1443. During the five-year truce from 1444 to 1449 he served as Lieutenant of France. On 31 March 1448 he was created Duke of Somerset. As the title had previously been held by his brother, he is sometimes mistakenly called the second duke, but the title was actually created for the second time, and so he was actually the first duke, the numbering starting over again.

Somerset was appointed to replace York as commander in France in 1448. Somerset was supposed to be paid £20,000; but little evidence exists that he was. Fighting began in Normandy in August 1449. Somerset's subsequent military failures left him vulnerable to criticism from York's allies. The most humiliating moment was when Somerset surrendered Rouen, the capital of Normandy, to the French without even a token siege. He failed to repulse French attacks, and by the summer of 1450 nearly all the English possessions in northern France were lost, with Normandy having fallen after the Battle of Formigny and Siege of Caen. By 1453 all the English possessions in the south of France were also lost, and the Battle of Castillon ended the Hundred Years War.

The fall of the duke of Suffolk left Somerset the chief of the king's ministers, and the Commons in vain petitioned for his removal in January 1451. Power rested with Somerset and he virtually monopolised it, with Margaret of Anjou, wife of Henry VI, as one of his principal allies. It was also widely suspected that Edmund had an extra-marital affair with Margaret. After giving birth to a son in October 1453, Margaret took great pains to quash rumours that Somerset might be his father. During her pregnancy, Henry had suffered a mental breakdown, leaving him in a withdrawn and unresponsive state that lasted for one and a half years. This medical condition, untreatable either by court physicians or by exorcism, plagued him throughout his life. During Henry's illness, the child was baptised Edward, Prince of Wales, with Somerset as godfather; if the King could be persuaded, he would become legal heir to the throne.

Somerset's fortunes, however, soon changed when his rival York assumed power as Lord Protector in April 1454 and imprisoned him in the Tower of London. Somerset's life was probably saved only by the King's seeming recovery late in 1454, which forced York to surrender his office. Henry agreed to recognise Edward as his heir, putting to rest concerns about a successor prompted by his known aversion to physical contact; subsequently he came to view Edward's birth as a miracle. Somerset was honourably discharged, and restored to his office as Captain of Calais.

By now York was determined to depose Somerset by one means or another, and in May 1455 he raised an army. He confronted Somerset and the King in an engagement known as the First Battle of St Albans, which marked the beginning of the Wars of the Roses. Somerset was killed in a last wild charge from the house where he had been sheltering. His son, Henry, never forgave York and Warwick for his father's death, and he spent the next nine years attempting to restore his family's honour.

Marriage and children
At sometime between 1431 and 1433 he married Eleanor Beauchamp, daughter of Richard de Beauchamp, 13th Earl of Warwick by his first wife Elizabeth de Berkeley, daughter and heiress of Thomas de Berkeley, 5th Baron Berkeley. Eleanor was an elder half-sister of Henry de Beauchamp, 1st Duke of Warwick and Anne de Beauchamp, 16th Countess of Warwick, wife of Richard Neville, 16th Earl of Warwick, known as the "Kingmaker". The marriage was without royal licence, which offence was pardoned on 7 March 1438. By his wife he had issue including:

Sons
 Henry Beaufort, 3rd Duke of Somerset (26 January 143615 May 1464), eldest son and heir, who was beheaded after the Battle of Hexham, where he commanded the Lancastrian troops. He died unmarried, but left an illegitimate son by his mistress Joan Hill:
Charles Somerset, 1st Earl of Worcester, 1st Baron Herbert (c.1460-1526), KG, who was given the surname "Somerset" and was created Baron Herbert in 1506 and Earl of Worcester in 1513. From him descend the Earls and Marquesses of Worcester and the present Dukes of Beaufort.
 Edmund Beaufort, 4th Duke of Somerset (14396 May 1471), who succeeded his elder brother. He was executed two days after being defeated in the Battle of Tewkesbury (4 May 1471), in which he commanded the van of the Lancastrian army, and was buried in Tewkesbury Abbey. Died unmarried, the last of the male line, when "the house of Beaufort and all the honours to which they were entitled became extinct".
 John Beaufort, Earl of Dorset (14414 May 1471), killed fighting for the Lancastrians during the Battle of Tewkesbury (4 May 1471), two days before his elder brother's execution. Died unmarried.
 (Thomas Beaufort (1442–1517), another son identified by Alison Weir, but not by the traditional sources)

Daughters
Following the death of all their brothers without issue, fighting for the Lancastrian cause, they became co-heiresses to their father, and their descendants were thus entitled to quarter the arms of Beaufort.

 Eleanor Beaufort (Countess of Ormond) (between 1431 and 143316 August 1501), who married firstly James Butler, 5th Earl of Ormond and secondly Sir Robert Spencer (d.pre-1510), of London and Bridport, Dorset, also of Ashbury in Devon; frequently stated erroneously in credible sources to be of Spencer Combe, Crediton, Devon. One of the two daughters and co-heiresses of Sir Robert Spencer by his wife Eleanor Beaufort was Margaret Spencer (1472–1536) (or Eleanor), who married Thomas Cary of Chilton Foliat in Wiltshire, the younger son of William Cary (1437–1471) of Cockington and Clovelly in Devon, whose descendants included Cary, Viscount Falkland; Cary, Baron Hunsdon; Cary, Baron Cary of Leppington, Earl of Monmouth; and Cary, Viscount Rochfort, Earl of Dover, all of whom quartered the arms of Beaufort. 
 Joan Beaufort (143311 August 1518), married firstly Robert St Lawrence, 3rd Baron Howth and secondly Sir Richard Fry.
 Anne Beaufort (143517 September 1496), who married Sir William Paston (1436before 7 September 1496), a younger son of William Paston (1378–1444), Justice of the Common Pleas.
 Margaret Beaufort, Countess of Stafford (1437–1474), married firstly Humphrey, Earl of Stafford and secondly Sir Richard Darell, of Littlecote (in Ramsbury), Wiltshire.
 Elizabeth Beaufort (1443before 1475), married Sir Henry Fitz Lewis.
 Mary Beaufort (born between 1431 and 1455)

Ancestry

Footnotes

Notes

References

Further reading

External links
 The Beaufort family  Retrieved 26 May 2018

1400s births
1455 deaths
Edmund Beaufort, 1st Duke of Somerset
Burials at St Albans Cathedral
201
Earls of Somerset
English military personnel killed in action
Knights of the Garter
Marquesses of Dorset
People of the Hundred Years' War
People of the Wars of the Roses